Jack Crawford defeated the defending champion Ellsworth Vines in the final, 4-6, 11-9, 6–2, 2-6, 6-4 to win the gentlemen's singles tennis title at the 1933 Wimbledon Championships.

Seeds 

  Ellsworth Vines (finalist)
  Jack Crawford (champion)
  Henri Cochet (semifinals)
  Bunny Austin (quarterfinals)
  Cliff Sutter (fourth round)
  Fred Perry (second round)
  Jiro Sato (semifinals)
  Harry Lee (fourth round)

Draw

Finals

Top half

Section 1

Section 2

Section 3

Section 4

Bottom half

Section 5

Section 6

Section 7

Section 8

References

External links

Men's Singles
Wimbledon Championship by year – Men's singles